Working Class Hero is a 1995 tribute album to the Beatles singer/songwriter John Lennon. It gets its name from a Lennon song of the same name.  Lindy Goetz, longtime manager of Red Hot Chili Peppers, acted as executive producer.  The album was released through Hollywood Records in support of the Humane Society of the United States. According to the back cover of the CD, "Fifty percent of artist royalties, producer royalties, and of Hollywood Records' net profits from this album will be contributed to a dedicated fund administered by the Humane Society of the United States of America and will be used for spaying and neutering cats and dogs." A PSA for the Humane society was released featuring the Chili Peppers to draw attention to the cause and the album.

Track listing
All songs written by John Lennon.

References

John Lennon tribute albums
1995 compilation albums
Hollywood Records compilation albums
Alternative rock compilation albums